Liparis atlanticus, the Atlantic snailfish or Atlantic seasnail, is a fish belonging to the genus Liparis.  It is a small tadpole-like fish with a soft, scaleless body and complex ventral sucker formed from heavily-modified pelvic fins. They have a single dorsal fin consisting of six spines, differentiated from the soft rays by slight notches. This species reaches a maximum length of about 5 inches. L. atlanticus are found in the coastal waters of the northwest Atlantic Ocean, ranging from Newfoundland to New Jersey. The Atlantic snailfish lives in intertidal zones and the immediately subtidal region to depths of 100 fathoms (183 m). In northern parts of its range, it is often found along the shoreline in wrack beds. It breeds in mid-winter, the eggs being laid amongst hydroid growths on the sea bed, and on stony ground. Its food is mainly small crustaceans, particularly shrimps, but occasionally small fishes are eaten.

References  

"Fishes of the World". Alwyne Wheeler.
"The Inland Fishes of New York State." C. Lavett Smith.

atlanticus
Fish of the Atlantic Ocean
Taxa named by David Starr Jordan
Taxa named by Barton Warren Evermann
Fish described in 1898